Ponerorchis tetraloba (synonym Amitostigma tetralobum) is a species of plant in the family Orchidaceae. It is endemic to China known from only Sichuan and Yunnan. The flowers are pink or pale purple.

Taxonomy
The species was first described in 1912 by Achille Eugène Finet, as Peristylus tetralobus. It has been placed in both Orchis and Amitostigma. A molecular phylogenetic study in 2014, in which this species was included as Amitostigma tetralobum, found that species of Amitostigma, Neottianthe and Ponerorchis were mixed together in a single clade, making none of the three genera monophyletic as then circumscribed. Amitostigma and Neottianthe were subsumed into Ponerorchis, with this species becoming Ponerorchis tetraloba.

References 

Endemic orchids of China
tetraloba
Endangered plants
Orchids of Yunnan
Flora of Sichuan
Plants described in 1912
Taxonomy articles created by Polbot
Taxobox binomials not recognized by IUCN